The men's hammer throw competition at the 1998 Asian Games in Bangkok, Thailand was held on 13 December at the Thammasat Stadium.

Schedule
All times are Indochina Time (UTC+07:00)

Results

References

External links
Results
Video of the competition

Men's hammer throw
1998